Glashagarriff Bridge situated  west of Coachford village in County Cork, Ireland is the meeting point of four townlands (Carhoo Lower, Carhoo Upper, Carrigathou and Coolnagearagh), two catholic parishes (Aghabullogue and Aghinagh) and two civil parishes (Aghinagh and Magourney).

Referred to as 'Clashgarriff Br.' on the 1841 surveyed OS map, and 'Glashagarriff Br.' on the 1901 surveyed OS map, the bridge spans the Glashagarriff River before it joins the River Lee a short distance to the south. Glashagarriff is an anglicised version of the Irish Glaise Gharbh (meaning ‘rough streamlet'). Smith in 1750, refers to the 'Glashigarriff' river.  At Cork Spring Assizes in 1807, a presentment was approved in favour of Richard Townsend and Cornelius Molony to repair 'Gassagariff bridge, between Cork and Macromp' for the amount of £10 9s 4d.  At Cork Spring Assizes in March 1828, an application for a presentment was approved for the amount of £71 8s 8d, in favour of Charles Colthurst, John Bowen, John Haly and William Haly 'to widen Glashagorrive bridge on the road from Cork to Macroom.  The Ordnance Survey name book (c. 1840) gives various versions such as 'Clashgorrave', 'Closhagorrave', 'Closhagorriff' and 'Closhagorriv', and describes the river as rising out of the bogs of Doneens and Lyroe, flowing between the parishes of Aghinagh, Aghabollogue and Magourney, and falling into the River Lee to the south. An Irish Tourist Association survey of 1944 refers to the Glashagarriff river as having brown trout and freshwater eels, but no salmon angling, nor permit for trout fishing required.

Many surviving bridges in mid-Cork are originally constructed of stone, arched in shape, and late eighteenth or early nineteenth century in date. Typical features include semi-circular arches and pointed breakwaters. Earlier bridges are often narrower, although some were widened at a later stage.

See also
Carhoo Lower (townland)
Carhoo Upper (townland)
Carhue House

References

External links
 1841 surveyed OS map (maps.osi.ie)
 1901 surveyed OS map (maps.osi.ie)
 acrheritage.info

Bridges in County Cork